Macrospina caboverdiana is a species of beetle in the family Cerambycidae, and the only species in the genus Macrospina. It was described by Mateu in 1956.

References

Phrissomini
Beetles described in 1956